The year 1778 in architecture involved some significant events.

Events
Ivan Starov draws up a radial urban master plan for the Russian city of Yaroslavl.

Buildings and structures

Buildings
Denton Hall, Wharfedale, England, designed by John Carr, is completed.
Reconstruction of Downton Castle, Herefordshire, England by Richard Payne Knight in Gothic Revival style is largely completed.
Emin Minaret, Turpan, modern-day China, is completed.
La Scala opera house in Milan (Lombardy), designed by Giuseppe Piermarini, is opened and remodelling of the Royal Palace of Milan by him is largely completed.

Awards
 Grand Prix de Rome, architecture: prize carried over to 1779.

Births
 January 4 – Jean-Antoine Alavoine, French architect (died 1834)
 August 31 – William Wilkins, English architect (died 1839)
 July 3 – Carl Ludvig Engel, Prussian architect working in Finland (died 1840)

Deaths
 November 9 – Giovanni Battista Piranesi, Italian etcher of architectural views (born 1720)

References 

Architecture
Years in architecture
18th-century architecture